Ram Bahadur Giri (born 1960) is a Nepalese boxer. He competed in the men's bantamweight event at the 1988 Summer Olympics.

References

External links
 

1960 births
Living people
Nepalese male boxers
Olympic boxers of Nepal
Boxers at the 1988 Summer Olympics
Place of birth missing (living people)
Bantamweight boxers